Methodist Mountain is a mountain summit in the northern Sangre de Cristo Range of the Rocky Mountains of North America. Methodist Mountain is the northernmost peak of the Sangre de Cristo Mountains, which stretch south through southern Colorado to Santa Fe, New Mexico.

Mountain

See also

List of Colorado mountain ranges
List of Colorado mountain summits
List of Colorado fourteeners
List of Colorado 4000 meter prominent summits
List of the most prominent summits of Colorado
List of Colorado county high points

References

External links

Mountains of Colorado
Mountains of Chaffee County, Colorado
Mountains of Saguache County, Colorado
Rio Grande National Forest
San Isabel National Forest
North American 3000 m summits